The Tale of the Destruction of the Rus' Land is a text of Old East Slavic literature dating back to the 13th century and known from two manuscripts of the 15th and 16th centuries. It is a reflection on the Mongol invasion of Kievan Rus'.

This is one of the most significant works in the Old East Slavic genre of the word, which is considered the forerunner of the essay genre.  The text is not fully known, as only fragments of it have survived.

Publication history
The manuscript was published in 1892 by Khrisanf Mefodievich Loparev in St. Petersburg, but as early as 1878 this source was known to the Pskov archaeologist K. G. Evlentiev. On the back of the top cover of the binding of the collection containing the Tale of the Destruction of the Rus' Land, on 24 May 1878, he made a postscript: “NB Genus of the Prologue. It begins with the story of Daniel the prophet (with spaces for drawings) - without a beginning. This is the 1st word. There are 22 words in all - September, October, November and December, March, April, May. The last, 22nd, Tale of the Destruction of the Rus' Land, about the death of the Grand Prince Yaroslav (and the Life of Alexander Nevsky) - only the beginning and end, there is no middle, the sheets are torn out. Too bad is a great "word". 16th century manuscript. Pskov."

Two copies of the manuscript were found: the Pskov-Pechersk one is dated to the 15th century, the Riga one is dated to the 16th century.

Dating and authorship
Dates proposed for the composition of the Tale of the Destruction of the Rus' Land range from 1238 (the beginning of the Mongol-Tatar invasion) to 1246 (the year of the death of Yaroslav Vsevolodovich (1191-1246) - the son of Vsevolod the Big Nest, the father of Alexander Nevsky. The prince is mentioned in the text, as if it were alive). Scholars disagree about where and when exactly it was written, with some arguing it was written somewhere in the northeast of the Rus' after the initial Mongol campaign of 1237–1238, while others maintain it was penned down later in Kiev (Kyiv) right after the Mongols sacked it in 1240.

The reason for writing was the news from Vladimir-Suzdalian Rus' about the invasion of Batu and the death of Yaroslav's brother Yuri in the battle with the Mongols in the battle on the Sit River. Some researchers believed that the Tale of the Destruction of the Rus' Land was originally a preface to the secular biography of Alexander Nevsky that has not come down to us. Alexander Solovyov categorically disagreed with this, referring to the fact that the "Word" was conceived and written during Yaroslav's lifetime. "The task [of the poetic work] was to sing of the former glory of the motherland in contrast to the terrible Tatar invasion; Grand Duke Yaroslav Vsevolodich, to whom the author was close, was to play the main role in this work".

There is an assumption that the description in the "Word" of the greatness and power of the Rus' land preceded the story about the invasion of Batu, which has not been preserved. This character of the introduction to the text, which was supposed to tell about the sorrows and troubles of the country, is not accidental. This feature of the Tale of the Destruction of the Rus' Land finds a typological correspondence with the works of ancient and medieval literature.

Views of scholars 
Professor M. N. Tikhomirov (1956), writing that the author of the Lay accurately reveals to readers a map of the Rus' land in the first half of the 13th century, concluded that 'the geographical terms of the author and his political hints lead us ... to the second or third decades of the 13th century', so that the “Word” was created after the Battle of the Kalka River and that Novgorod was the “far away” from where its author looked at the Rus' land. It was written "even before the Batu campaigns, during the reign of Yaroslav Vsevolodich in Novgorod," the current Yaroslav "(according to the author of the manuscript), maybe around 1225". This opinion was already expressed in 1929 by Alexei Sobolevsky.

Professor N. K. Gudziy believes that the “Word” was written not in Novgorod, but most likely in Pereyaslavl, before the Battle of the City on 4 March 1238, since in it Yuri, and not Yaroslav, is called the Prince of Vladimir.

The philologist Alexander Solovyov, opposing the versions about the writing of the Lay in Novgorod, notes that the author is very accurate in designating the southwestern border of Rus' with the Ugrians, Czechs, Poles, Yatvyaz and Lithuanians. However, when approaching Novgorod and Pskov, its accuracy disappears. The Tale of Bygone Years knows within these limits the neighbors and tributaries of Rus': Korshi, narowa, lib, zimegola, chud, wes, jääm. The author of the Lay does not name any of these tribes, although they should have been known in Novgorod, he only says "to the Germans" and from the Germans makes a leap across the Gulf of Finland "to the Korels." Meanwhile, the Novgorod chronicles constantly mention the Chud (Ests) as their neighbors, besides, the Chud was subordinate at that time not to the Germans, but to the Danes, whom the singer of the Lay did not mention either.

Alexander Solovyov also draws attention to the last words of the passage: "from the great Yaroslav and to Volodimer (Monomakh) and to the present Yaroslav and to his brother Yury Prince Volodimersky." According to Solovyov, the present is a living ruler, protagonist of the work. Therefore, the author of the Tale of the Destruction intended to sing, against the backdrop of the past greatness of the Rus' land, its current Grand Duke Yaroslav. “The fact that his older brother Yuri Vsevolodich is modestly called the ‘Prince of Volodimer’, is not called the ‘current’ and is placed after his younger brother Yaroslav, makes it possible to conclude that the Lay was written after the Battle of the City on 4 March 1238. After this catastrophe, in the midst of the terrible “destruction of the Rus' Land”, Yaroslav survived, remained the legitimate heir to the listed grand dukes, the organizer of the devastated homeland. The singer wants to sing him, but he only mentions his brother Yuri, because he wanted to touch on the battle in the City and the tragic death of this prince and all his troops", the scholar concludes.

Charles J. Halperin (1976, 1981) argued that the text was not written in Northeastern Rus', and Serhii Plokhy (2006) stated that he believed 'that Halperin offers sufficient evidence to rule out this [option]'.

Content 

In response to the devastation caused by the "pagan" Mongols, the author invoked his Christian identity in order to portray the Rus' as a Christian land: "Thou, Rus' Land, art rich in wealth and the Orthodox Christian faith." The text goes on to state that the Rus' Land is blessed by "ecclesiastical houses" (domy tserkovnye), monasteries or churches, and illuminated by the Christian religion (svetlorusskaia zemlia).

According to the text, the Burtas, Cheremis, Mordvins, and the Veda or Viada (probably a Finno-Ugric people) were tributaries of Kievan Rus' during the reign of Vladimir II Monomakh.

Proximity to The Tale of Igor's Campaign 
The Tale of the Destruction of the Rus' Land is considered by many researchers to be close to a number of fragments of The Tale of Igor's Campaign.

Alexander Soloviev refers to the words of Dmitry Likhachev: 'the feeling of the motherland as a grandiose living being, as the totality of all native history, culture and nature' was already expressed with particular force in The Tale of Igor's Campaign and 'this broad image of the Rus' land permeates Rus' literature throughout its development".

Just like The Tale of Igor's Campaign, the Lay wanted to recall the 'old times of strife', which were a 'disease' for Christians, in order to lead to a tragic catastrophe, to the invasion of the Tatars, which became 'death' for the Rus' land,' Alexander Solovyov wrote.

Place in medieval literature 
Alexander Soloviev (1958) believed that the Tale of the Destruction of the Rus' Land is extremely valuable as a vivid manifestation of national consciousness, along with The Tale of Igor's Campaign. In this respect, it occupies a prominent place in contemporary medieval poetry.

He compared the Tale and The Tale of Igor's Campaign with a Cantar de mio Cid, created in the middle of the 12th century. It is difficult to find a clear patriotic idea in the latter. A long poem (3370 verses) is dedicated to the glorification of a person whose heroism is rather ambiguous: he is disobedient to his king, expelled by him from the Kingdom of Castile, he is a "bandit" in the legal sense of the word. Having collected 60 of the same exiles, Sid fights at his own peril and risk.

Genre originality 
In Old East Slavic literature, the genre of Tale of the Destruction occupies a special place, bringing it closer to the later Western European essay genre, says Lyudmila Kaida (Doctor of Philology at Lomonosov Moscow State University). External similarity - “in the manner of ancient Rus' authors to reflect on the problems of philosophy, religion, life. The similarity is internal - in the compositional-speech model of the spontaneous development of thought". “The ancient world is manifested for us through the personality of the author, patriotic involvement in the fate of the Rus' land through his philosophical thoughts. All this is close to the reader-author relationship in essay literature,” the researcher believes.

Notes

References

Bibliography 
 
 
 
 
 
 
 
 
 
 

East Slavic literature
Mongol invasion of Kievan Rus'